Alan Francis may refer to:

Alan Francis (horseshoes), 15-time world horseshoes champion from Ohio
Alan Francis (writer), comedian and writer from Scotland

See also
Alun Francis (born 1943), Welsh conductor
Allen Frances (born 1942), American psychiatrist
Allan Francis (born 1971), Canadian fencer